Bogdan Titomir (born March 16, 1967, in Odessa, Ukrainian SSR) is a Ukrainian and Russian musician, rapper and DJ, who began his career in a popular 1990s duo Car-Man. Although Titomir's style derives from western stars such as MC Hammer and Vanilla Ice, as well as C&C Music Factory, he has established his own distinct style as a pop and rap performer as well as a DJ.

Biography
Bogdan Titomir was born March 16, 1967, in Odessa. His parents were engineers. His mother's maiden name was Titorenko. In childhood, he learned to play guitar and piano. After school he served in the army, where he participated in amateur performances. After that he began  working with other musicians (Laskoviy Mai, Dmitriy Malikov, Vladimir Maltsev).

In 1989, together with Sergey Lemokh he formed the duo Car-Man. At 1991 he left the group and started solo career. Since 2011 he works at the Peretz TV.

Discography
1992 — Высокая энергия (Vysokaya Energiya/High Energy)
1993 — Высокая энергия 2
1995 — X-Love (Самая большая любовь XXL)
1999 — Моя Любимая Пупса (My Lovely Pussy)
2003 — Проект БТР (БТР Project)
2004 — Indikator: CD1 — Xclusive, CD2 — Energie, CD3 — Minimal
2005 — Hidroplan: CD1 — Crystal, CD2 — Bubble Gum, CD3 — Orange Bud
2006 — Свобода (Svoboda/Freedom)
2010 — Нежный; Грубый (Tender; Rude)
2011 — Очень важный перец (Very Important Pepper)

References

External links
Official Web Site

1967 births
Russian people of Ukrainian descent
Living people
People from Odesa
Russian rappers
Russian hip hop
Russian hip hop musicians